Raymond Anthony Lopez (born May 26, 1978) is an American politician who is currently a member of the Chicago City Council serving as alderman of the 15th Ward in Chicago, Illinois. 

A member of the Democratic Party, Lopez was first elected as Democratic Committeeman of the 15th Ward in 2012, becoming the first openly gay Mexican-American to be elected in Illinois.  On April 7, 2015, Lopez was elected alderman of the 15th Ward. The 15th ward includes the West Englewood, Brighton Park, Back of the Yards, and Gage Park neighborhoods.

Early life and education
Born in Chicago, Lopez is a graduate of St. Laurence Catholic High School. Lopez was first introduced to politics at the age of 18 when he became a precinct captain under the William Lipinski organization of the 23rd Ward on the Southwest Side of Chicago. He studied at the University of Illinois at Chicago.

Prior to his political career, Lopez worked as a skycap for Southwest Airlines at Midway International Airport. He was a skycap for 12 years.

Career
In 2011, Lopez ran unsuccessfully for alderman of the 15th Ward, forcing the incumbent into a run-off election.

In 2012, after the incumbent Democratic Committeeman withdrew from the race, Lopez ran unopposed.  In 2012, as a result of redistricting following the 2010 United States Census, the demographics of the 15th Ward changed. Previously, the 15th Ward only included the neighborhoods of Chicago Lawn/Marquette Manor and West Englewood.  The new 15th Ward (c. 2012) now includes significant portions of Brighton Park, Back of the Yards, Gage Park, and New City, with West Englewood still remaining.

Chicago City Council
In 2015, Lopez again ran to represent the newly redrawn 15th Ward on the Chicago City Council.  In a primary field of seven candidates, Lopez narrowly missed winning outright by 127 votes.  In the April 7, 2015 run-off election, Lopez successfully obtained 58% of the total vote.  On May 18, 2015, Lopez was sworn in along with the mayor, city treasurer, city clerk, and 49 other alderman at the Chicago Theatre.

In the first round of the 2019 Chicago mayoral election, Lopez endorsed Gery Chico for mayor.

2023 Chicago mayoral election 
On April 6, 2022, Lopez announced his intention to run in the 2023 Chicago mayoral election. No Chicago City Council member has ever been elected mayor, although two have been appointed to the office to fill vacancies.

On November 21, 2022, after fundraising and collecting petition signatures to run for mayor, Lopez instead dropped out of the race and filed to run for re-election to city council.

Criticism of Lori Lightfoot
Lopez has emerged as a top critic of Mayor Lori Lightfoot in the City Council. On May 31, 2020, during a conference call with all 50 Chicago aldermen regarding protests in response to the police murder of George Floyd, Lopez got into a heated argument with Lightfoot over her supposed insufficient response to “looters,” culminating with the two swearing at one another.

Personal life
Lopez is openly gay. He refers to his dogs as his “children”  He is married to Hugo Lopez.

References

1978 births
21st-century American politicians
Chicago City Council members
Gay politicians
LGBT Hispanic and Latino American people
American LGBT city council members
LGBT people from Illinois
Living people
Mexican-American people in Illinois politics